HD 29697 (Gliese 174, V834 Tauri) is a variable star of BY Draconis type in the constellation Taurus. It has an apparent magnitude around 8 and is approximately 43 ly away.

Description
HD 29697 is the Henry Draper Catalogue number of this star.  It is also known by its designation in the Gliese Catalogue of Nearby Stars, Gliese 174, and its variable star designation V834 Tauri.

V834 Tauri is a BY Draconis variable with maximum and minimum apparent magnitudes of 7.94 and 8.33 respectively, so it is never visible to the naked eye.

The star has been examined for indications of a circumstellar disk using the Spitzer Space Telescope, but no statistically-significant infrared excess was detected.

References

BY Draconis variables
Taurus (constellation)
Tauri, V834
029697
021818
Gliese and GJ objects
Durchmusterung objects
K-type main-sequence stars